The 2017 Overton's 400, was a Monster Energy NASCAR Cup Series race held on July 30, 2017 at Pocono Raceway in Long Pond, Pennsylvania. Contested over 160 laps on the  superspeedway, it was the 21st race of the 2017 Monster Energy NASCAR Cup Series season.

Report

Background

Pocono Raceway (formerly Pocono International Raceway), also known as the Tricky Triangle, is a superspeedway located in the Pocono Mountains of Pennsylvania at Long Pond. It is the site of two annual NASCAR Sprint Cup Series races held just weeks apart in early June and late July/early August, one NASCAR Xfinity Series event in early June, one NASCAR Camping World Truck Series event in late July/early August, and two ARCA Racing Series races in early June and late July/early August.  From 1971 to 1989, and again since 2013, the track has also hosted an Indy Car race, currently sanctioned by the IndyCar Series and run in August.

Pocono is one of a very few NASCAR tracks not owned by either Speedway Motorsports, Inc. or International Speedway Corporation, the dominant track owners in NASCAR. It is run by the Igdalsky siblings Brandon and Nicholas, both of whom are third-generation members of the family-owned Mattco Inc, started by Joseph II and Rose Mattioli.  Mattco also owns South Boston Speedway in South Boston, Virginia.

Outside of the NASCAR races, Pocono is used throughout the year by Sports Car Club of America (SCCA) and motorcycle clubs as well as racing schools. The triangular oval also has three separate infield sections of racetrack – North Course, East Course and South Course. Each of these infield sections use a separate portion of the tri-oval to complete the track.  During regular non-race weekends, multiple clubs can use the track by running on different infield sections.  Also some of the infield sections can be run in either direction, or multiple infield sections can be put together – such as running the North Course and the South Course and using the tri-oval to connect the two.

Entry list

Practice

First practice

Final practice

Qualifying

Qualifying results

Race

First stage
Kyle Busch led the field to the green flag at 3:20 p.m. The field didn't complete a full lap when rounding the third turn, Matt Kenseth got loose and spun, triggering an eight-car wreck that brought out the first caution. Aric Almirola took the worst damage on his way to a last-place finish.

Back to green on the eighth lap, cars started hitting pit road to short-pit the first stage on Lap 15. Busch pitted from the lead on Lap 22, as did Erik Jones after a four-lap stint in front. Ricky Stenhouse Jr. led the next 11 circuits, before diving onto pit road on Lap 37, cycling the lead to Kenseth. He didn't hold the lead for long, however, as Busch passed him going into Turn 1 to take the lead on Lap 42 and drove on to win the first stage that concluded on Lap 51. He opted to pit under the stage break, while Kenseth stayed out to retake the lead. Teammate Denny Hamlin restarted from the tail-end of the field for speeding.

Second stage
On fresher tires, Busch powered by the outside of Kenseth in Turn 3 to return to the lead on the Lap 56 restart. When the field came back through Turn 3 a lap later, Jimmie Johnson spun, after contact with teammate Kasey Kahne, and hit the wall, bringing out the third caution.

The race restarted on Lap 62. A drive-shaft piece that came from Kyle Larson's car brought out the fourth caution on Lap 70. Hamlin stayed out to get the race lead, but was relegated to second on the restart, bumping up Austin Dillon, for not maintaining pace car speed.

It made no difference, however, as Hamlin regained the lead going into Turn 1 on the Lap 75 restart. He led the next 15 laps, before Martin Truex Jr. got to his inside exiting Turn 1 and took the lead heading down the Long Pond Straightaway. Truex was among a slew of cars that opted to short-pit for the position to win towards the end of the second stage on Lap 98, handing the lead to Clint Bowyer, who won the stage on Lap 101. Truex resumed his place up front when Bowyer pitted.

Final stage
The race restarted on Lap 106. Cars started hitting pit road for their final pit stop with 37 laps to go. Race leader Truex pitted with 34 to go, handing the lead to Busch, who had yet to pit. He did so with 25 to go, handing the lead to Brad Keselowski. When he stopped five laps later, the lead cycled to Hamlin. During the cycle, Joey Logano was hit with a pass through penalty for speeding, and a stop and go penalty for pitting to service his car during his pass through.

With 17 to go, Kevin Harvick took the lead from Hamlin going into Turn 1. But Busch caught Harvick going into Turn 3, bumped him out of the racing groove and drove on to victory.

Race results

Stage results

Stage 1
Laps: 50

Stage 2
Laps: 50

Final stage results

Stage 3
Laps: 60

Race statistics
 Lead changes: 9 among different drivers
 Cautions/Laps: 5 for 21
 Red flags: 0
 Time of race: 2 hours, 50 minutes and 7 seconds
 Average speed:

Media

Television
NBC Sports covered the race on the television side. Rick Allen and Dale Jarrett had the call from the regular booth for the race. Jeff Burton and Steve Letarte had the call in the new NBC's stock car smarts booth for the race. Dave Burns, Marty Snider and Kelli Stavast reported from pit lane during the race.

Radio
Motor Racing Network had the radio call for the race, which was  simulcast on Sirius XM NASCAR Radio.

Standings after the race

Drivers' Championship standings

Manufacturers' Championship standings

Note: Only the first 16 positions are included for the driver standings.
. – Driver has clinched a position in the Monster Energy NASCAR Cup Series playoffs.

References

2017 Overton's 400
2017 Monster Energy NASCAR Cup Series
2017 in sports in Pennsylvania
July 2017 sports events in the United States